Hrodivka is an urban-type settlement in the Pokrovsk Raion, Donetsk Oblast (province) of eastern Ukraine. The population is

Demographics
Native language as of the Ukrainian Census of 2001:
 Ukrainian 86.91%
 Russian 12.77%
 Belarusian 0.09%
 Armenian 0.03%

References

Urban-type settlements in Pokrovsk Raion